Acetobacter pomorum is a bacterium first isolated from industrial vinegar fermentations. Its type strain is LTH 2458T.

References

Further reading
Whitman, William B., et al., eds. Bergey's manual of systematic bacteriology. Vol. 2. Springer, 2012. 
Sagarzazu, Noelia Isabel, et al. "Optimization of denaturing high performance liquid chromatography technique for rapid detection and identification of acetic acid bacteria of interest in vinegar production." Acetic Acid Bacteria 2.1s (2013): e5.
Solieri, Lisa, and Paolo Giudici. Vinegars of the World. Springer Milan, 2009.

External links

LPSN
Type strain of Acetobacter pomorum at BacDive -  the Bacterial Diversity Metadatabase

Rhodospirillales
Bacteria described in 1998